Shahpur Tehsil is a subdivision (tehsil) of Sargodha District in the Punjab province of Pakistan. Its capital is Shahpur and administratively subdivided into 16 Union Councils.
Population is 353,325 (2017) being mainly Muslim and Punjabi speaking. The Tiwana family and the Maken family are the main families and biggest landlords of this region.

History 
In 1914 the district headquarters were moved from Shahpur to Sargodha, although the district continued to be known as Shahpur. In 1960 the Sargodha District was created and Shahpur District became Shahpur Tehsil.

Geography 
Shahpur Tehsil is second largest tehsil of sargodha district with an area of 787 km square.

Topography 
Shahpur Tehsil mainly comprises fertile plains and river Jhelum flows on western and north western side.

Transportation 
Several roads run through Shahpur tehsil like Sargodha-Mianwali road, Bhera-Jhawarian road and Shapur-Bhalwal road. Moreover, Shahpur Tehsil is also linked with railway as it contains a  Railway station at Shahpur Saddar.

Union Councils
Name of Union Councils 

 Ghangwal                         
 Khawaja abad                      
 Kalra                                
 Manke wala                           
 Jhawarian (Jhawarian)         
 Kot Bhai Khan
 Kot Pehlwan
 Bakhar Bar
 Shahpur Sadar (Urban)
 Aqil Shah
 Shahpur City (Urban)
 Kandan
 Mangowal
 Jahan Abad
 Sabowal
 Jalal Pur Jadeed
 Gondal
 Chakrala

References

Sargodha District
Tehsils of Punjab, Pakistan
Populated places in Sargodha District